Maurice O'Sullivan (5 October 1892 – 25 August 1972), an Australian politician, was a member of the New South Wales Legislative Assembly from 1927 until 1959. He was variously a member of the Australian Labor Party (NSW) and the Labor Party. He held numerous ministerial positions between 1941 and 1956 including Minister for Health and Minister for Transport.

Early life
O'Sullivan was born in Paddington, New South Wales and was the son of a publican. He was educated at the Christian Brother's School, Paddington and initially worked as an apprentice coach painter with the New South Wales Government Railways. He became active in the Federated Coachmakers' Employees Union but took over the licence of his father's hotel, The Lord Dudley, and then continued in a career as a publican. He was active in community organizations in the Paddington area and was elected as an alderman on Paddington Municipal Council between 1923 and 1934. He was the mayor in 1927

State Parliament
O'Sullivan was elected to parliament at the 1927 election for the newly re-established seat of Woollahra. Due to a redistribution the seat became untenable for Labor at the 1930 election and he transferred to the seat of Paddington. The sitting Nationalist member for Paddington, Daniel Levy, successfully contested Woolahra. O'Sullivan retained Paddington at the next 9 elections and retired from parliament at the 1959 election . He was a member of the Australian Labor Party (NSW) while that party was separated from the Federal executive of the Labor Party between 1931 and 1936 and was the party whip from 1932 till 1941.

With the election of the Labor government of William McKell at the 1941 election, O'Sullivan was appointed Minister for Transport, a position he retained until 1950. He was then commissioned as the Minister for Health and he stayed in this post until 1956. He retired in 1959.

References

 

1892 births
1972 deaths
Members of the New South Wales Legislative Assembly
Australian Labor Party members of the Parliament of New South Wales
20th-century Australian politicians
Mayors of Paddington (New South Wales)